Words on Black Plastic was the second album by the Scottish Progressive rock group Forever More. Recorded in 1970, it was released as a vinyl album in 1970. It features Future The Average White Band members Onnie McIntyre, Alan Gorrie & Molly Duncan. Roger Ball also appears as an arranger on this LP.

Track listing
All titles written by Alan Gorrie and Mick Travis.
Side 1
"Promises of Spring" - 4:56
 Mick Travis - electric guitar
 Onnie McIntyre - electric guitar
 Alan Gorrie - bass, vocals, arrangements
 Stuart Francis - drums
Roger Ball - arrangements
"The Wrong Person" - 3:30
 Mick Travis - acoustic guitar, vocals
 Onnie McIntyre - electric guitar
 Alan Gorrie - bass, vocals, acoustic guitar
 Stuart Francis - drums
"Last Breakfast" - 3:11
 Mick Travis - acoustic guitar, vocals
 Onnie McIntyre - electric guitar solo
 Alan Gorrie - bass, vocals
 Stuart Francis - drums
"Get Behind Me, Satan" - 5:57
 Mick Travis - electric and acoustic guitar solo
 Alan Gorrie - piano, vocals
 Onnie MacIntyre - bass
 Stuart Francis - drums

Side 2
"Put Your Money on a Pony" - 4:00
 Mick Travis - electric guitar
 Onnie McIntyre - electric guitar
 Alan Gorrie - bass, vocals, piano
 Stuart Francis - drums
"Lookin' Through the Water" - 3:05
 Mick Travis - acoustic guitar, vocals, mandolin, banjo
 Onnie McIntyre - electric guitar
 Alan Gorrie - bass, vocals
 Stuart Francis - drums
"O'Brien's Last Stand" - 3:00
 Mick Travis - slide guitar
 Onnie MacIntyre - guitar
 Alan Gorrie - bass, vocals
 Stuart Francis - drums
"Angel of the Lord" - 3:25
 Mick Travis - acoustic guitar, vocals
 Onnie McIntyre - electric guitar solo
 Alan Gorrie - bass, piano
 Stuart Francis - drums
"What a Lovely Day" - 6:02
 Mick Travis - acoustic guitar, vocals
 Onnie McIntyre - electric guitar
 Alan Gorrie - bass, vocals
 Stuart Francis - drums, percussion

References

The Tapestry of Delights - an online guide to U. K. beat and progressive music between 1963 - 1976.

1970 albums
RCA Victor albums
Forever More (band) albums